The Kigach (Qiğaş) is a river of southern Russia (Astrakhan Oblast) and Kazakhstan (Atyrau Region). A left distributary of the Akhtuba, it is part of the Volga Delta.

Rivers of Kazakhstan
Rivers of Astrakhan Oblast
Volga basin